"Big Boys Cry"/"Beautiful" is the 38th maxi single released by Japanese recording artist Namie Amuro. It was released on March 6, 2013 and was her last single released under the label Avex Trax. The single peaked at #4 on Oricon, it’s her lead single for her eleventh studio album Feel.

Both songs were used by Kosé to promote their make-up line: Esprique.

Big Boys Cry was first heard in a commercial promoting Kosé's make up line: Kosé Esprique on February 23, 2013. The song was then made its debut at the Tokyo Girls Collection 2013 Spring/Summer Fashion Show where Namie Amuro performed the song live as a surprise guest. Finally, its promotional music video was released on March 5, 2013.

Beautiful was first featured in a Christmas themed commercial in November 2012. Although commercials for the single showed footage of a music video for Beautiful, one was never released.

Track listing

Charts

References

2013 singles
Namie Amuro songs
Avex Trax singles
Songs written by Hayley Aitken
2013 songs